Evesham Township is a township in Burlington County, in the U.S. state of New Jersey. It is a suburb of Philadelphia, the nation's sixth-most populous city. As of the 2020 United States census, the township's population was 46,826, an increase of 1,288 (+2.8%) from the 2010 census count of 45,538, which in turn reflected an increase of 3,263 (+7.7%) from the 42,275 counted in the 2000 census. Colloquially, the area is referred to as Marlton, the name of a community within the township.

The township is part of the South Jersey region of the state and the Delaware Valley (Philadelphia metro area).

History
The area now known as Evesham Township was originally settled by Quakers in 1672. The township was named either for the town of the same name in England or prominent English settler Thomas Eves.

Evesham Township was formed on November 6, 1688, as Eversham (with an "R" in the middle of the name that was lost in subsequent years) in the Province of West Jersey before the county was formed. It was incorporated by the Township Act of 1798 of the New Jersey Legislature on February 21, 1798, as one of New Jersey's original group of 104 townships. Parts of the township were taken to form Washington Township (November 19, 1802), Medford Township (March 1, 1847) and Mount Laurel Township (March 7, 1872).

The township was substantially larger than it is today, originally including what are now Mount Laurel, Medford, Lumberton, Hainesport, Shamong, and Washington Townships. The South Branch of the Rancocas on the East Side and Cropwell Creek on the West Side bound this area. Evesham Township was eventually incorporated in 1692 as one of the thirteen Townships in Burlington County. In 1802, a tract was cut off for Washington Township; in 1847, the township was then divided in half, with the eastern half becoming Medford Township; and in 1872, Evesham was divided again, for the last time, with the northern part becoming Mount Laurel Township.

Marlton is a name commonly associated and interchangeable with the name Evesham, derived from the census-designated place within Evesham. The name Marlton came about in the early 19th century and stems from the word "marl", a naturally occurring mixture of green clay with remnants of shells used as a fertilizer, like manure. Its discovery helped local commerce and fueled the first "building boom", which took place in the 1830s and 1840s. Marl was mined locally until 1930, when the pits were closed.

The Marlton area was recognized as a village in 1758. The village was named Marlton in 1845. The same year the "Evesham" Post Office and the "Evesham" Baptist Church both had their names changed to "Marlton" Post Office and the "Marlton" Baptist Church. The names remain the same today. Most maps and directional signs refer to Marlton instead of Evesham. The historic village, Olde Marlton, remains mostly intact and is a locally regulated Historic District. Full-time police services began in 1966.

Evesham remained largely unchanged until the 1950s, when developers began buying farms and building the township's first housing developments. Today, no significant farmland remains.

In 1955, the United States Army opened the PH-32 Nike Ajax facility on a  site on Tomlinson Mill Road. This battery was one of twelve used to shield Philadelphia, Pennsylvania from aerial assault during the Cold War. The base was decommissioned in the mid-1960s and used for various functions, including a civil defense center. The site is now a housing development that was built in the mid-1990s.

Geography
According to the United States Census Bureau, the township had a total area of 29.59 square miles (76.62 km2), including 29.16 square miles (75.51 km2) of land and 0.43 square miles (1.11 km2) of water (1.45%).

"Marlton" is often used in place of the township's name, even when referring to locations beyond the CDP's boundaries.

Other unincorporated communities, localities and place names partially or completely within the township include Berlin Heights, Cambridge, Cropwell, Crowfoot, Donlontown, Elmwood Road, Evans Corner, Evesboro, Gibbs Mill, Milford, Pine Grove and Tomlinsons Mill.

The township borders the municipalities of Mount Laurel Township and Medford Township in Burlington County; and Berlin Township, Cherry Hill, Voorhees Township and Waterford Township in Camden County.

The township is one of 56 South Jersey municipalities included within the New Jersey Pinelands National Reserve, a protected natural area of unique ecology covering , that has been classified as a United States Biosphere Reserve and established by Congress in 1978 as the nation's first National Reserve. Part of the township is included in the state-designated Pinelands Area, which includes parts of Burlington County, along with areas in Atlantic, Camden, Cape May, Cumberland, Gloucester and Ocean counties.

Demographics

2010 census

The Census Bureau's 2006–2010 American Community Survey showed that (in 2010 inflation-adjusted dollars) median household income was $88,980 (with a margin of error of +/− $2,687) and the median family income was $104,784 (+/− $3,519). Males had a median income of $73,801 (+/− $3,907) versus $50,667 (+/− $3,039) for females. The township's per capita income was $39,910 (+/− $1,464). About 1.5% of families and 2.5% of the population were below the poverty line, including 2.5% of those under age 18 and 4.6% of those age 65 or over.

2000 census
As of the 2000 United States census, there were 42,275 people, 15,712 households, and 11,344 families residing in the township. The township's racial makeup was 91.26% White, 3.11% African American, 0.07% Native American, 4.07% Asian, 0.02% Pacific Islander, 0.48% from other races, and 0.99% from two or more races. Hispanic or Latino of any race were 1.96% of the population.

There were 15,712 households, of which 38.2% had children under the age of 18 living with them, 61.2% were married couples living together, 8.5% had a female householder with no husband present, and 27.8% were non-families. 22.8% of all households were made up of individuals, and 6.0% had someone living alone who was 65 years of age or older. The average household size was 2.68 and the average family size was 3.21.

The township's population was spread out, with 27.2% under the age of 18, 6.0% from 18 to 24, 34.8% from 25 to 44, 23.1% from 45 to 64, and 8.9% who were 65 years of age or older. The median age was 36 years. For every 100 females, there were 94.1 males. For every 100 females age 18 and over, there were 90.3 males.

The township's median household income was $67,010, and the median family income was $77,245. Males had a median income of $54,536 versus $36,494 for females. The township's per capita income was $29,494. About 1.7% of families and 2.8% of the population were below the poverty line, including 3.0% of those under age 18 and 3.4% of those age 65 or over.

Government

Local government 
Evesham Township operates within the Faulkner Act, formally known as the Optional Municipal Charter Law, under the Council-Manager plan 11 form of municipal government, as implemented as of July 1, 1983, based on the recommendations of a Charter Study Commission. The township is one of 42 municipalities (of the 564) statewide that use this form of government. The township had first switched to the Council-Manager Plan B of the Faulkner Act on July 1, 1969 to replace the township committee government.

The governing body is comprised of the Mayor and the four-member Township Council, all elected at-large in elections held every other year. The Mayor is elected directly by the voters. Members are elected in partisan elections to serve four-year terms of office on a staggered basis, with two council seats up for vote in even-numbered years as part of the November general election. In 2009, a change was approved to shift municipal elections from May to November and from non-partisan to partisan, with officials citing low May turnout and costs estimated at $50,000 to oversee the municipal elections.

, the Mayor of Evesham Township is Democrat Jaclyn Veasy, whose term of office ends December 31, 2022. Members of the Evesham Township Council are Deputy Mayor Heather Cooper (D, 2022), Ginamarie A. Espinoza (D, 2024), Eddie S. Freeman III (D, 2024) and Patricia Hansen (D, 2022).

In the May 2009 municipal elections, Republicans Kurt Croft, Debbie Hackman and Joe Howarth were elected, with the three taking office on July 1, 2009, and giving Republicans control of the council.

On March 6, 2010, Democratic Mayor Randy Brown announced he was switching parties to become a Republican, citing philosophical disagreements. That same year, he endorsed Jon Runyan, a Republican for Congress.

In November 2010, the Republican slate swept the township's first partisan elections, with Mayor Randy Brown and Councilmember Debbie Hackman winning re-election along with newcomer Steve Zeuli.

Deputy Mayor Joe Howarth resigned from the council in December 2011 in advance of taking a seat on the Burlington County Board of Chosen Freeholders, with his council seat filled until November 2012 chosen from among prospective candidates selected by the local Republican committee. In January 2012, Ken D'Andrea was selected to fill Howarth's vacancy. Robert DiEnna was chosen in September 2013 to fill the vacancy of Kurt Croft following his resignation.

Federal, state and county representation 
Evesham Township is in the 3rd Congressional District and is part of New Jersey's 8th state legislative district.

 

Burlington County is governed by a Board of County Commissioners comprised of five members who are chosen at-large in partisan elections to serve three-year terms of office on a staggered basis, with either one or two seats coming up for election each year; at an annual reorganization meeting, the board selects a director and deputy director from among its members to serve a one-year term. , Burlington County's Commissioners are
Director Felicia Hopson (D, Willingboro Township, term as commissioner ends December 31, 2024; term as director ends 2023),
Deputy Director Tom Pullion (D, Edgewater Park, term as commissioner and as deputy director ends 2023),
Allison Eckel (D, Medford, 2025),
Daniel J. O'Connell (D, Delran Township, 2024) and 
Balvir Singh (D, Burlington Township, 2023). 
Burlington County's Constitutional Officers are
County Clerk Joanne Schwartz (R, Southampton Township, 2023)
Sheriff James H. Kostoplis (D, Bordentown, 2025) and 
Surrogate Brian J. Carlin (D, Burlington Township, 2026).

Politics
As of March 2011, there were 30,697 registered voters in Evesham Township, of which 8,924 (29.1% vs. 33.3% countywide) were registered as Democrats, 7,282 (23.7% vs. 23.9%) were registered as Republicans and 14,475 (47.2% vs. 42.8%) were registered as Unaffiliated. There were 16 voters registered to other parties. Among the township's 2010 Census population, 67.4% (vs. 61.7% in Burlington County) were registered to vote, including 87.9% of those ages 18 and over (vs. 80.3% countywide).

In the 2012 presidential election, Democrat Barack Obama received 12,507 votes here (52.7% vs. 58.1% countywide), ahead of Republican Mitt Romney with 10,863 votes (45.7% vs. 40.2%) and other candidates with 234 votes (1.0% vs. 1.0%), among the 23,752 ballots cast by the township's 32,323 registered voters, for a turnout of 73.5% (vs. 74.5% in Burlington County). In the 2008 presidential election, Democrat Barack Obama received 13,071 votes here (54.0% vs. 58.4% countywide), ahead of Republican John McCain with 10,764 votes (44.5% vs. 39.9%) and other candidates with 218 votes (0.9% vs. 1.0%), among the 24,186 ballots cast by the township's 30,579 registered voters, for a turnout of 79.1% (vs. 80.0% in Burlington County). In the 2004 presidential election, Democrat John Kerry received 11,419 votes here (49.7% vs. 52.9% countywide), ahead of Republican George W. Bush with 11,369 votes (49.5% vs. 46.0%) and other candidates with 147 votes (0.6% vs. 0.8%), among the 22,989 ballots cast by the township's 28,314 registered voters, for a turnout of 81.2% (vs. 78.8% in the whole county).

In the 2013 gubernatorial election, Republican Chris Christie received 8,664 votes here (67.4% vs. 61.4% countywide), ahead of Democrat Barbara Buono with 3,890 votes (30.3% vs. 35.8%) and other candidates with 129 votes (1.0% vs. 1.2%), among the 12,848 ballots cast by the township's 32,005 registered voters, yielding a 40.1% turnout (vs. 44.5% in the county). In the 2009 gubernatorial election, Republican Chris Christie received 7,628 votes here (53.7% vs. 47.7% countywide), ahead of Democrat Jon Corzine with 5,626 votes (39.6% vs. 44.5%), Independent Chris Daggett with 698 votes (4.9% vs. 4.8%) and other candidates with 133 votes (0.9% vs. 1.2%), among the 14,196 ballots cast by the township's 31,081 registered voters, yielding a 45.7% turnout (vs. 44.9% in the county).

Economy

Education 
The Evesham Township School District serves students in pre-kindergarten through eighth grade. As of the 2021–22 school year, the district, comprised of eight schools, had an enrollment of 4,384 students and 348.0 classroom teachers (on an FTE basis), for a student–teacher ratio of 12.6:1. Schools in the district (with 2021–22 enrollment data from the National Center for Education Statistics) are 
Helen L. Beeler Elementary School with 544 students in grades K-5, 
Frances S. DeMasi Elementary School with 283 students in grades K-5, 
Robert B. Jaggard Elementary School with 452 students in grades K-5, 
Marlton Elementary School with 430 students in grades K-5, 
Richard L. Rice Elementary School with 559 students in grades PreK-5, 
J. Harold Van Zant Elementary School with 573 students in grades K-5, 
Frances S. DeMasi Middle School with 732 students in grades 6-8 and 
Marlton Middle School with 772 students in grades 6-8.

Public school students in ninth through twelfth grades attend Cherokee High School, which opened a  addition in September 2001. As of the 2021–22 school year, the high school had an enrollment of 2,165 students and 174.9 classroom teachers (on an FTE basis), for a student–teacher ratio of 12.4:1. The high school is part of the Lenape Regional High School District, which also serves students from Medford Lakes, Medford Township, Mount Laurel Township, Shamong Township, Southampton Township, Tabernacle Township and Woodland Township.

Students from Evesham Township, and from all of Burlington County, are eligible to attend the Burlington County Institute of Technology, a countywide public school district that serves the vocational and technical education needs of students at the high school and post-secondary level at its campuses in Medford and Westampton.

Private schools include St. Joan of Arc School, a Catholic school established in 1965 that serves students in preschool through eighth grade. The school operates under the supervision of the Roman Catholic Diocese of Trenton.

Transportation

Roads and highways

Route 70, which runs east-west across the northern part of the township, Route 73, which runs north-south along the township's western border, and County Route 544 (Marlton Parkway / Taunton Lake Road) are the major roadways in the township.

Evesham Township was the location of the Marlton Circle, which served as the junction of Route 70 and Route 73. In 2011, the circle, which handled 90,000 vehicles a day and was the site of as many as 175 accidents a year, was replaced by a grade-separated interchange that allows Route 73 to pass over Route 70.

Public transportation
NJ Transit provides bus service in the township on the 406 route that runs between Berlin and Philadelphia.

The Atco station, in Waterford Township just south of the township's border, provides New Jersey Transit train service to the 30th Street Station in Philadelphia and the Atlantic City Rail Terminal in Atlantic City on the Atlantic City Line.

Notable people

People who were born in, residents of, or otherwise closely associated with Evesham Township include:

 Dawn Marie Addiego (born 1962), member of the New Jersey Senate since 2010 who served on the Evesham Township Council from 1993 to 2000
 Shawn Andrews (born 1982), offensive lineman for the New York Giants, formerly played for the Philadelphia Eagles
 Brian Baldinger (born 1960), former NFL offensive tackle and current Fox Sports commentator
 Esther E. Baldwin (1840-1910), missionary, teacher and writer
 Jay Black (born 1976), stand-up comic and screenwriter
 Braille (stage name of Bryan Winchester, born 1981), rapper
 Christopher J. Brown (born 1971), member of the New Jersey General Assembly
 Sheldon Brown (born 1979), defensive back for the Philadelphia Eagles and the Cleveland Browns
 Greg Burke (born 1982), former professional baseball pitcher who played for the San Diego Padres and New York Mets
 Anthony Caruso (born 1966), entrepreneur
 Mike Devlin (born 1969), former NFL offensive lineman who has been an assistant coach with the New York Jets
 Joshua Evans (1731–1798), Quaker minister, journalist and abolitionist
 Christina Grimmie (1994–2016), YouTube musician and season 6 contestant on The Voice
 Ashley Harder (born 1986), winner of the Miss New Jersey USA 2007 title
 Brian Herzlinger (born 1976), film director and star of My Date with Drew
 LeRoy Homer Jr. (1965–2001), co-pilot of United Airlines Flight 93 who was killed in the September 11, 2001 terrorist attacks
 Joe Howarth (born 1955), politician who has represented the 8th Legislative District in the New Jersey General Assembly since 2016
 John Inskeep (1757–1834), Mayor of Philadelphia from 1800 to 1801, and from 1805 to 1806
 Pam Jenoff (born 1971, class of 1989), author of Quill award-nominated The Kommandant's Girl
 Andy Kim (born 1982), representative of New Jersey's 3rd congressional district
 Tom Knight (born 1974), former NFL cornerback
 Pelle Lindbergh (1959–1985), former goaltender for the Philadelphia Flyers
 LeSean McCoy (born 1988), running back with the Buffalo Bills
 Jody McDonald (born 1959), sports radio talk show host on WTEL 610 and also on WFAN 660
 Brit Morgan (born 1987), actress who has portrayed Debbie Pelt in the HBO series True Blood
 Blaine Neal (born 1978), former Major League Baseball relief pitcher
 Dennis Norman (born 1980), football player
 Jessica O'Rourke (born 1986), professional soccer player
 Jerry Penacoli (born 1956), actor, former newscaster, current correspondent on Extra
 Mike Quick (born 1959), former wide receiver and current color commentator for the Philadelphia Eagles
 Raymond Rizzo (born 1992), pro-gamer, three-time Pokémon Video Game World Champion and first American to win the Pokémon Video Game World Championship
 Sav Rocca (born 1973), punter for the Washington Redskins, formerly played for the Philadelphia Eagles
 Maria Rodriguez-Gregg (born 1981), member of the New Jersey General Assembly
 Richard Ruccolo (born 1972), actor who has appeared in Two Guys and a Girl and Rita Rocks
 Chris Therien (born 1971), former defenseman for the Philadelphia Flyers and Dallas Stars. Currently works as a color commentator for the Philadelphia Flyers
 Carl Truscott (born 1957), former Director of the Bureau of Alcohol, Tobacco, Firearms and Explosives
 Jessica Woodard (born 1995), track and field athlete who competes in shot put.

References

Further reading
Horner, Maurice W. A History of Evesham Township. (Philadelphia: Dorrance, 1971).
McCabe, Wayne T. A Penny A View...An Album of Postcard Views...Marlton, N.J. (Newton, NJ: Historic Preservation Alternatives, 2001).

External links

Evesham Township's official site
Evesham Township School District

Data for the Evesham Township School District, National Center for Education Statistics
Cherokee High School District
Evesham Library

 
1688 establishments in New Jersey
Faulkner Act (council–manager)
Populated places in the Pine Barrens (New Jersey)
Populated places established in 1688
Townships in Burlington County, New Jersey